Mikayıllı (also, Mikailly and Mikeyly) is a village and municipality in the Jalilabad Rayon of Azerbaijan.  It has a population of 1,201.

References 

Populated places in Jalilabad District (Azerbaijan)